Thullura Vayasu is a 2006 Tamil language romantic drama film produced and directed by Gopal. The film stars newcomers Raghava and Deepika, with newcomer Guhan, Kottai Perumal and Sharmili playing supporting roles. The film had musical score by Karthik Raja and was released on 14 July 2006.

Plot

The film begins with Raghavan (Raghava), who hails from Coimbatore, joining a medical college in Chennai as a first-year student. In his hostel, Raghavan starts to remember his school life and his first love.

Raghavan and Deepika (Deepika) studied in the same class and they were good friends. Raghavan hailed from a middle-class family while Deepika was from a rich family. Raghavan and Deepika then fell in love with each other but they didn't have the courage to convey their love. The last of school, Raghavan sneakily put a love letter in Deepika's book and Deepika did the same thing. Unfortunately, the two failed to read the love letters and thought that their love had failed. Thereafter, Vilvanathan (Guhan) gave Deepika sleeping pills and he convinced Raghav and his friends that she had committed suicide after failing her exam. The grief-stricken Raghav was unable to bear the constant reminders of his lover that his school and town were filled with. Raghavan's father then got a transfer to Delhi and Raghavan moved there but he failed to get a seat in any college in Delhi, so Raghav returned to Chennai to join a medical college.

Vilvanathan is hell-bent to save his family's prestige so he threatens his sister Deepika to kill her lover Raghavan if she is still in love with him. When Vilvanathan came to know of Raghavan's return, he sends henchmen to kill him and decides to send Deepika to study in the US. Raghavan is then stunned to encounter his lover Deepika alive and he successfully gets rid of Vilvanathan's henchmen. Finally, Vilvanathan arrives and beats Raghavan up. Deepika, who first begs her brother to spare him, encourages Raghavan to fight him back and Raghavan defeats him.

Cast

Raghava as Raghavan
Deepika as Deepika
Guhan as Vilvanathan 
Kottai Perumal
Sharmili
Vinoth as Saamy
Saravanan
Kannan
Balu
Kalaimani
Sangili Murugan
Noor Mohamed
Manikandan
Josri
O. K. Natraj
Kicha
Hasina
Chithra
Rajeshwari
Saranya Nag as Cherin
Laksha in a special appearance

Soundtrack

The film score and the soundtrack were composed by Karthik Raja. The soundtrack, released in 2006, features 5 tracks with lyrics written by Na. Muthukumar and Gopal.

Release

Initially, the film had its release date fixed on 10 February 2006, but it was released on 14 July 2006. A reviewer said, "The debutant director Gopal has boldly dealt with the subject of teenage love. The lead roles fit the hero and heroine like a glove. In that, the director has done a good job in casting the right persons for playing the main roles. Karthik Raja could have done better. Cinematography of Raja Rajan is an added treat in the movie".

After the poor response of the film, the film director Gopal planned to re-release the film. Thullura Vayasu, which was rechristened as Idhayam Unakkaga and released, has been given the original name again. Certain portions of the film were re-shot in accordance with the audience's feedback. The director also sought the views of the film going public on the title, and since many felt that Thullura Vayasu suited the film better, the director Gopal has now decided to retain the title as Thullura Vayasu. It was re-released on 14 February 2007.

References

2006 films
2000s Tamil-language films
Indian romantic drama films
2006 romantic drama films
Films scored by Karthik Raja
2006 directorial debut films